Manuel de Zumaya or Manuel de Sumaya (c. 1678 - 21 December 1755) was perhaps the most famous Mexican composer of the colonial period of New Spain. His music was the culmination of the Baroque style in the New World. He was the first person in the western hemisphere to compose an Italian-texted opera, entitled Partenope (now lost). Similar to Antonio Vivaldi, Zumaya was also a life-long, active Roman Catholic priest.

Life
Manuel de Zumaya was born in Mexico. In 1715, he was appointed chapelmaster of Mexico City's cathedral, and was one of the first Americans to become one. He served there until 1738 when he moved to Oaxaca, where he followed his close friend Bishop Tomas Montaño against the vigorous and continuous protests of the Mexico City Cathedral Chapel Council for him to stay.

Manuel de Zumaya died on December 21, 1755, in Oaxaca, where he had resided since 1738.

Style
His works are a multiplicity of his talents and styles. He was a master of the older Renaissance style and of the newer Baroque style.

In 1711, the new Viceroy of New Spain, Don Fernando de Alencastre Noroña y Silva, Duke of Linares, a devotee of Italian opera, commissioned Zumaya to translate Italian libretti and write new music for them. The libretto of the first, La Parténope survives in the Biblioteca Nacional de Mexico in Mexico City, though the music has been lost.

The Hieremiae Prophetae Lamentationes is a Gregorian-style antiquated notational piece.

Zumaya authored the charmingly jolly Sol-fa de Pedro (Peter's Solfeggio) in 1715 during the examinations to select the Chapel Master at Mexico City's cathedral.

Zumaya's other famous piece, Celebren Publiquen, shows his ability to handle the polychoral sound of the high Baroque era. With his distribution of the choral resources into two choirs of unequal size, he copied the style that was favoured by the Spanish and Mexican choral schools in the early 18th century. The rich textures and instrumental writing reflect Zumaya's "modern" style and are at the opposite end of the spectrum from his anachronistic Renaissance settings.

Zumaya's recessional Angelicas Milicias presents his ability to superbly combine the Baroque orchestra and choir to create a sublime and stately piece in honor of the Virgin Mary.
The interludio, Albricias Mortales, is done in much the same style as Angelicas Milicias.

Bibliography
 Barwick, Steven. Two Mexico City Choirbooks of 1717. Carbondale, Illinois: Southern Illinois University Press, 1982. 
 Zumaya, Manuel de, in The New Grove Dictionary of American Music.

External links

1670s births
1755 deaths
18th-century classical composers
18th-century male musicians
Male opera composers
Mexican classical composers
Mexican male classical composers
Mexican opera composers
Musicians from Mexico City
Mexican Baroque composers